Habash (also Romanized as Ḩabash) is a village in Qanibeyglu Rural District, Zanjanrud District, Zanjan County, Zanjan Province, Iran. At the 2006 census, its population was 200, in 51 families.

References 

Populated places in Zanjan County